The 2022 Raptors de Naucalpan season was the Raptors de Naucalpan seventh season in the Liga de Fútbol Americano Profesional (LFA) and their fifth under head coach Guillermo Gutiérrez. After the 2021 season was cancelled due to the COVID-19 pandemic, the Raptors returned to play in 2022.

Raptors finished the regular season as the fourth ranked team with a 4–2 record. The Raptors were defeated by the Fundidores on the semifinal 27–30 with a touchdown pass from Shelton Eppler to Tavarious Battiste on the last play of the game.

The Raptors returned to play their home games in the Estadio FES Acatlán, after playing in the Estadio José Ortega Martínez for the previous two seasons.

Draft

Roster

Regular season

Standings

Schedule

Postseason

Schedule

References

2022 in American football
Raptors